Polycheles sculptus is a species of "strange, blind crustacean" resembling a prawn or a squat lobster.

Gallery

References

Polychelida
Arthropods of the Dominican Republic
Crustaceans described in 1880
Taxa named by Sidney Irving Smith
Taxobox binomials not recognized by IUCN